Charlotte Beaumont is an English actress known for portraying Chloe Latimer in the ITV crime drama Broadchurch, as well as for her roles in Waterloo Road and the film Jupiter Ascending.

Filmography

Television

Film

Stage

References

External links
 

English film actresses
English television actresses
Living people
21st-century English actresses
1995 births